Molybdenum hexafluoride, also molybdenum(VI) fluoride, is the inorganic compound with the formula MoF6. It is the highest fluoride of molybdenum. It is a colourless solid and melts just below room temperature and boils in 34 °C. It is one of the seventeen known binary hexafluorides.

Synthesis 
Molybdenum hexafluoride is made by direct reaction of molybdenum metal in an excess of elemental fluorine:
 + 3  → 

Typical impurities are MoO2F2 and MoOF4, reflecting the tendency of the hexafluoride to  hydrolyze.

Description 
At −140 °C, it crystallizes in the orthorhombic space group Pnma.  Lattice parameters are a = 9.394 Å, b = 8.543 Å, and c = 4.959 Å.  There are four formula units (in this case, discrete molecules) per unit cell, giving a density of 3.50 g·cm−3. The fluorine atoms are arranged in the hexagonal close packing.

In liquid and gas phase, MoF6 adopt octahedral molecular geometry with point group Oh. The Mo–F bond length is 1.817 Å.

Applications 
Molybdenum hexafluoride has few uses.  In the nuclear industry, MoF6 occurs as an impurity in uranium hexafluoride since molybdenum is a fission product of uranium.  It is also an impurity in tungsten hexafluoride, which is used in the semiconductor industry.  MoF6 can be removed by reduction of a WF6-MoF6 mixture with any of a number of elements including hydrogen iodide at moderately elevated temperature.

References 

Molybdenum(VI) compounds
Hexafluorides
Molybdenum halides
Octahedral compounds